Greenheart Games is an independent video game developer founded in July 2012 by brothers Patrick and Daniel Klug. Game Dev Tycoon, a business simulation game, is its first and only released game. A second, unrelated business simulation game is currently in development by the company.

The headquarters are in Brisbane, Australia but is served online with different developers from many different countries.

Products 
A year after the release of their first game, Game Dev Tycoon, Greenheart Games laid plans for their second game, Tavern Keeper, which is currently under development.

Tavern Keeper is currently in alpha build, with a beta release expected in 2020. The game has been under development since 2014, and is a humorous fantasy tavern simulator. This second game has been known under the name 'Game #2', and the project was kept from the public until 23 November 2016, when its announcement was sent by e-mail to subscribers of Greenheart Games' newsletter.

References

External links
 Official website

Australian companies established in 2012
Video game development companies